Anemmalocera is a monotypic snout moth genus described by Hans Georg Amsel in 1961. It contains the single species, Anemmalocera flavescentella, described by the same author, which is found in Iran.

References

Phycitinae
Monotypic moth genera
Moths of Asia
Taxa named by Hans Georg Amsel
Pyralidae genera